Szonowice  is a village in the administrative district of Gmina Rudnik, within Racibórz County, Silesian Voivodeship, in southern Poland.

The village has a population of 280.

Gallery

References

Szonowice